The Lords Appellant were a group of nobles in the reign of King Richard II, who, in 1388, sought to impeach some five of the King's favourites in order to restrain what was seen as tyrannical and capricious rule. The word appellant — still used in modern English by attorneys — simply means '[one who is] appealing'. It is the older (Norman) French form of the present participle of the verb appeler, the equivalent of the English 'to appeal'. The group was called the Lords Appellant because its members invoked a procedure under law to start prosecution of the king's unpopular favourites known as 'an appeal': the favourites were charged in a document called an "appeal of treason", a device borrowed from civil law which led to some procedural complications.

Members
There were originally three Lords Appellant: Thomas of Woodstock, Duke of Gloucester, son of Edward III and thus the king's uncle; Richard FitzAlan, Earl of Arundel and of Surrey; and Thomas de Beauchamp, Earl of Warwick. These were later joined by Henry Bolingbroke, Earl of Derby (the future king Henry IV) and Thomas de Mowbray, Earl of Nottingham.

Success 

They achieved their goals, first establishing a Commission to govern England for one year from 19 November 1386. In 1387, the Lords Appellant launched an armed rebellion against King Richard and defeated an army under Robert de Vere, Earl of Oxford at the skirmish of Radcot Bridge, outside Oxford. They maintained Richard as a figurehead with little real power.

They had their revenge on the king's favourites in the "Merciless Parliament" (1388). The nominal governor of Ireland, de Vere, and Richard's Lord Chancellor, Michael de la Pole, Earl of Suffolk, who had fled abroad, were sentenced to death in their absence. Alexander Neville, Archbishop of York, had all his worldly goods confiscated. The Lord Chief Justice, Sir Robert Tresilian, was executed, as were Sir Nicholas Brembre, Lord Mayor of London, John Beauchamp of Holt, Sir James Berners, and Sir John Salisbury. Sir Simon Burley was found guilty of exercising undue influence over the king and was sentenced to death. Derby and Nottingham, together with the Duke of York, tried to win a reprieve for him, but he was executed on 5 May.

Aftermath
In 1389, Richard's uncle, John of Gaunt, returned from Spain and Richard was able to rebuild his power gradually until 1397, when he reasserted his authority and destroyed the principal three among the Lords Appellant. However, in 1399 Richard was deposed by Gaunt's son, Henry of Bolingbroke, partly as a result of the royal confiscation of Gaunt's estate on his death. Bolingbroke succeeded him as Henry IV.

Richard never forgave the Lords Appellant. His uncle Gloucester was murdered in captivity in Calais; it was (and remains) widely believed that he was killed on Richard's orders. The Earl of Arundel was beheaded. Warwick lost his title and his lands and was imprisoned on the Isle of Man until Richard was overthrown by Henry Bolingbroke. The behaviour of the two junior Lords Appellant, Bolingbroke and Mowbray, probably influenced Richard's decision in 1398 to exile them both, and to revoke the permission he had given them to sue for any inheritance which fell due, as it did in relation to Mowbray's grandmother and, more significantly, of Bolingbroke's father, John of Gaunt.

References 

14th century in England
Medieval English people
Richard II of England